Paulo Jorge Vieira Alves (born 5 May 1981), known as Paulo Jorge, is a Portuguese former footballer who played mainly as a right midfielder.

He amassed Primeira Liga seasons of 103 games and six goals over six seasons, representing in the competition Boavista, Benfica, Marítimo, Gil Vicente and Belenenses. He also played professionally in Spain and Saudi Arabia.

Club career
Paulo Jorge was born in Maia, Porto District. After six seasons in the second division with F.C. Maia (this included loan spells in the lower leagues with Pedrouços A.C. and F.C. Infesta), he joined Boavista F.C. for 2005–06.

After a solid Primeira Liga spell at the latter, where he scored seven goals in all competitions, clubs like Valencia CF and PSV Eindhoven showed interest in acquiring Paulo Jorge's services but, after turning down an offer from champions FC Porto, he signed for S.L. Benfica in July 2006. With the Lisbon team, he started in UEFA Champions League matches against FK Austria Wien (both legs of the third qualifying round) and F.C. Copenhagen and Manchester United (group stage).

However, after having appeared sparingly during the league campaign, Paulo Jorge was loaned to Spanish side Málaga CF, whom achieved La Liga promotion in 2008. He shared teams with compatriots Eliseu and Hélder Rosário during his stint.

Paulo Jorge was definitely sold in mid-July 2008, and joined C.S. Marítimo. He scored his first competitive goal for the Madeirans on 4 January 2009 during a 4–1 home win over F.C. Paços de Ferreira, and spent most of the season as a right-back.

References

External links

1981 births
Living people
People from Maia, Portugal
Sportspeople from Porto District
Portuguese footballers
Association football midfielders
Association football utility players
Primeira Liga players
Liga Portugal 2 players
Segunda Divisão players
F.C. Maia players
Boavista F.C. players
S.L. Benfica footballers
C.S. Marítimo players
Gil Vicente F.C. players
C.F. Os Belenenses players
Segunda División players
Málaga CF players
Saudi Professional League players
Ittihad FC players
Portuguese expatriate footballers
Expatriate footballers in Spain
Expatriate footballers in Saudi Arabia
Portuguese expatriate sportspeople in Spain
Portuguese expatriate sportspeople in Saudi Arabia